Charles Auguste (born 25 November 1999) is a professional footballer who plays as a midfielder for Houston Dynamo. Born in Canada, he is a youth international for Haiti.

Club career
Auguste played soccer in highschool with Collège Ahuntsic, and semi-pro in his native Quebec with CS St-Hubert from 2017 to 2019. He enrolled at Creighton University and was part of the Creighton Bluejays men's soccer team, helping them reach the semi-finals of the 2022 2022 Men's College Cup. In total, he made 63 appearances for the Blue Jays and scored 9 goals, and was in 2020 named to the BIG EAST Conference Second Team All-Star, and in 2022 to the First Team. In 2021 and 2022, he played with Chicago FC United in USL League Two.

Auguste made himself eligible for the 2023 MLS SuperDraft but wasn't selected. He was signed off waivers by the Major League Soccer side Houston Dynamo, signing a professional contract.

International career
Born in Canada, Auguste is of Haitian descent. He was called up to the Haiti U20s for a training camp in July 2017, where he made one appearance.

Playing style
Auguste is a versatile midfielder, with quick feet and a good pass. He is a team leader, and strong in offense as well as defense.

Career statistics

References

External links
 
 MLS Soccer profile
 Creighton Blue Jays profile

1999 births
Living people
Soccer players from Montreal
Haitian footballers
Haiti youth international footballers
Canadian soccer players
Haitian people of Canadian descent
Canadian people of Haitian descent
Association football midfielders
CS St-Hubert players
Creighton Bluejays men's soccer players
Chicago Fire FC players
Houston Dynamo FC players
Première ligue de soccer du Québec players
USL League Two players
Haitian expatriate footballers
Haitian expatriates in the United States
Canadian expatriate soccer players
Canadian expatriates in the United States
Expatriate soccer players in the United States